Old Brown's Mill School is a historic one-room school located at Antrim Township in Franklin County, Pennsylvania. It was built in 1836, and is a 1 1/2-story, limestone building with an "A"-shaped shingle roof.  It housed a school until 1921.  It was restored in 1934, and, in 1962, was acquired by the Pennsylvania Historical and Museum Commission.

It was listed on the National Register of Historic Places in 1973.

The school is now owned by the Franklin County Historical Society and open to the public in the summer.

References

External links

Brown’s Mill School - Franklin County Historical Society

One-room schoolhouses in Pennsylvania
School buildings on the National Register of Historic Places in Pennsylvania
School buildings completed in 1836
Schools in Franklin County, Pennsylvania
Museums in Franklin County, Pennsylvania
Education museums in the United States
National Register of Historic Places in Franklin County, Pennsylvania